Chelsie Monica Ignesias Sihite (born 2 November 1995) is an Indonesian chess player and Twitch streamer. She received the FIDE title of Woman International Master (WIM) in 2011 and has also represented Indonesia in five chess olympiads (Khanty-Mansiysk 2010, Istanbul 2012, Tromsø 2014, Baku 2016, Batumi 2018).

Chess career
In June 2011, she has earned a Woman International Master title during the 12th ASEAN+ Age Group Chess Championship in Tarakan. She scored 6.5 points (+5 =3 -1), finishing in joint first place with Võ Thi Kim Phung and Zhansaya Abdumalik but placing third on tiebreak points.

In August 2012, she participated in the World Junior Chess Championship in Athens. She scored 8.5 points (+8 =1 -4), finishing in eighth place, a point behind the winner, Guo Qi.

In September 2012, she has earned her first Woman Grandmaster norm during the 40th Chess Olympiad in Istanbul. She scored 8 points (+7 =2 -1), the third-best individual performance on board two, behind Betul Cemre Yildiz and Irina Krush. Indonesian National Team team finished in 24th place.

In November 2015, she has won Indonesia's 45th National Women Chess Championship in Jakarta. She scored 8 points (+6 =4 -0), finishing outright first, half point ahead of Shanti Nur Abidah and Medina Warda Aulia.

In June 2019, she has earned her second Woman Grandmaster norm during the JAPFA Women Grandmaster Chess Tournament in Yogyakarta. She scored 6 points (+3 =6 -1), finishing the tournament in fifth place, a point behind the winner, Lương Phương Hạnh.

In October 2020, she participated in the Asian Nations (Regions) Women Online Cup. She scored 5 points (+5 =0 -4) during the tournament stage and 3.5 points (+3 =1 -2) in the knockout phase. Indonesian National Team finished sixth during the tournament stage and took second place in the knockout phase, losing only to India in the final.

References

External links
 
 
 
 

1995 births
Living people
Indonesian chess players
Indonesian female chess players
Chess Woman International Masters
Chess Olympiad competitors
People from Balikpapan
Southeast Asian Games medalists in chess
Southeast Asian Games gold medalists for Indonesia
Southeast Asian Games silver medalists for Indonesia
Southeast Asian Games bronze medalists for Indonesia
Competitors at the 2011 Southeast Asian Games
Competitors at the 2013 Southeast Asian Games
Competitors at the 2019 Southeast Asian Games
Competitors at the 2021 Southeast Asian Games
20th-century Indonesian women
21st-century Indonesian women